Horjak is a surname. Notable people with the surname include:

Branko Horjak (born 1950), Yugoslav footballer and manager
Cédric Horjak (born 1979), French footballer
Ciril Horjak (born 1975), Slovene comic book artist and book and newspaper illustrator

Slovene-language surnames